The River de Chute is a river in Maine and New Brunswick. 
This section of the river forms the border between Carleton County, New Brunswick and Victoria County, New Brunswick.

See also
List of rivers of Maine
List of bodies of water of New Brunswick

References

Maine Streamflow Data from the USGS
Maine Watershed Data From Environmental Protection Agency

Tributaries of the Saint John River (Bay of Fundy)
Rivers of Aroostook County, Maine
Rivers of New Brunswick